Suragabad or Suregabad may refer to:
 Suragabad, Qaleh Ganj
 Suragabad, Sorkh Qaleh, Qaleh Ganj County